Daniel Vançan (born 25 October 1996) is a Brazilian football player who plays for Inter de Limeira on loan from Mirassol.

Club career
He made his professional debut in the Segunda Liga for Gil Vicente on 24 August 2016 in a game against Académico de Viseu.

References

External links
 
 Daniel Vançan at ZeroZero
 Profile at São Bernardo

1996 births
Living people
Brazilian footballers
Brazilian expatriate footballers
Gil Vicente F.C. players
Associação Ferroviária de Esportes players
Botafogo Futebol Clube (SP) players
Mirassol Futebol Clube players
São Bernardo Futebol Clube players
Clube do Remo players
Associação Atlética Internacional (Limeira) players
Campeonato Brasileiro Série C players
Liga Portugal 2 players
Association football defenders
Brazilian expatriate sportspeople in Portugal
Expatriate footballers in Portugal